Orawan Paranang (born 7 September 1997) is a Thai table tennis player. She competed in the 2020 Summer Olympics.

Achievements
Women's doubles

References

External links
 

1997 births
Living people
Orawan Paranang
Table tennis players at the 2020 Summer Olympics
Orawan Paranang
Orawan Paranang
Orawan Paranang
Table tennis players at the 2018 Asian Games
Competitors at the 2021 Southeast Asian Games
Orawan Paranang
Orawan Paranang
Orawan Paranang
Orawan Paranang